Sebastiania leptopoda is a species of flowering plant in the family Euphorbiaceae. It was described in 1975. It is native from Chiapas, Mexico to Guatemala.

References

Plants described in 1975
Flora of Guatemala
Flora of Mexico
leptopoda